Quintero is a brand of premium cigars, owned by British conglomerate Imperial Brands. The brand is produced in Cuba by Habanos S.A., the local state-owned tobacco company, which also owns the brands Cohiba, Montecristo, and Romeo y Julieta.

History
The Quintero cigar brand was created as Quintero y Hermanos or Quintero and Brothers, when Agustin Quintero and his four brothers opened a small cigar factory in the town of Cienfuegos, Cuba in 1924 and began producing a handmade cigar.  Cienfuegos, a city on the southern coast of Cuba, is located near the Vuelta Arriba of the Remedios tobacco growing region, and the brand is one of the few Cuban cigar brands not born in the heartland of the prime tobacco growing region of Vuelta Abajo.

The Quintero brand and its blend of tobacco quickly became commercially successful both in Cuba and abroad, and the Quintero brothers soon developed several sizes of cigars.  By the 1940s, Quintero y Hermanos had opened a much larger rolling factory in Havana, and had begun using prime tobaccos from the Vuelta Abajo region.  The brand continued to grow in sales, and was particularly popular in Spain.

It the early 1960s, after Fidel Castro nationalized the Cuban cigar industry, the Quintero brand was repositioned as a primarily machine-made cigar, and most of the handmade sizes were dropped in favor of machine-made or hand-finished cigars using short filler tobaccos, sometimes sold in aluminum tubes or tubos.  For many years, Quintero was the only Cuban machine-made brand to be globally marketed by Habanos SA. As before, a large part of Quintero production went to Spain.  Unusual among Cuban cigars, the Quintero cigar blend is noted for a herbal flavor with sweet aftertaste.  The cigars generally benefit from several months of additional aging before smoking.

Modern Cuban production
In 2002, as part of a marketing strategy to promote Cuban cigars as premium products, the Cuban government marketing organization, Habanos S.A. chose to discontinue machine-made cigars in favor of handmade versions.  The Quintero cigar line was completely revamped and is now offering totalmente a mano (totally hand made) cigars in four sizes produced at the factory in Cienfuegos. The cigars are medium-to-full bodied in strength and are handmade with a short-filler (Tripa Corta) blend of tobacco leaves from the Vuelta Abajo and Semi-Vuelta zones of the Pinar del Río region of Cuba. The roller combines chopped tobacco leaves and rolls the filler into full- length binder leaves with the aid of a flexible mat fixed to form a bunch, with the wrapper applied by hand in the normal fashion.

Non-Cuban production
There is also a non-Cuban Quintero cigar made in Santa Rosa de Copán, Honduras from Honduran and Nicaraguan tobaccos, and marketed by Altadis S.A. in several sizes.

Vitolas
The following list of vitolas de salida (commercial vitolas) within the Quintero marque lists their size and ring gauge in Imperial (and Metric), their vitolas de galera (factory vitolas), and their common name in Cuban and American cigar slang.

Hand-Made Vitolas
Breva - 5" × 41 (140 × 16.27 mm), a Corona
Londres Extra - 4" × 40 (124 × 15.88 mm), Corona Corta, a Petit Corona
Nacionales - 5" × 41 (140 × 16.27 mm), a Corona
Panetela - 5" × 36 (127 × 14.29 mm), Veguerito, a short Panetela
Favoritos - 4.5" x 50 (115 x 20 mm) aka Concha No. 2, a Robusto
 Tubulares -133 x 16.27mm

See also 
 Cigar brands

References

External links
 
 Quintero Cigars Reviews

Cuban brands
Habanos S.A. brands
Imperial Brands brands